This is a list of UCLA Bruins football players in the NFL Draft.

Key

Selections

References

Ucla

UCLA Bruins NFL Draft